The 2009 AFC Cup was the sixth season of the AFC Cup and is competed among clubs from nations who are members of the Asian Football Confederation.

With the Asian Football Confederation reviewed the format of the AFC Champions League and made significant changes to way the competition is run, the teams that qualified for the AFC Cup is also from different countries compared to the previous editions.

Allocation of entries per association
A total of 32 clubs will participate in the 2009 AFC Cup. Below is the qualification scheme for the 2009 AFC Cup.

2 teams to qualify from each of the following associations:
 Hong Kong
 Iraq
 Jordan
 Kuwait
 Lebanon
 Malaysia
 Maldives
 Oman
 Syria
 Yemen
1 team to qualify from each of the following associations:
 Bahrain
 India
 Singapore
 Thailand
 Uzbekistan
 Vietnam
3 teams which did not satisfy the criteria to participate in the 2009 AFC Champions League qualifying play-offs (so each association had one additional team to qualify):
 Bahrain
 Lebanon
 Vietnam
3 losers from AFC Champions League 2009 qualifying play-offs

Participating Countries in Region
Following are the 2009 AFC Cup Participants.

 1 These clubs had qualified for the 2009 AFC Champions League, but were removed as their nations did not meet AFC Criteria.

Round and draw dates

Group stage

The draw for the group stage was held on 12 January 2009 in Kuala Lumpur, Malaysia.

Each club plays double round-robin (home and away) against fellow three group members, a total of 6 matches each. Clubs receive 3 points for a win, 1 point for a tie, 0 points for a loss. The clubs are ranked according to points and tie breakers are in following order: 
Greater number of points obtained in the group matches between the teams concerned;
Goal difference resulting from the group matches between the teams concerned; (Away goals do not apply)
Greater number of goals scored in the group matches between the teams concerned; (Away goals do not apply)
Goal difference in all the group matches;
Greater number of goals scored in all the group matches;
Kicks from the penalty mark if only two teams are involved and they are both on the field of play;
Fewer score calculated according to the number of yellow and red cards received in the group matches; (1 point for each yellow card, 3 points for each red card as a consequence of two yellow cards, 3 points for each direct red card, 4 points for each yellow card followed by a direct red card)
Drawing of lots.

Winners and runners-up of each group will qualify for the next round.

Group A

Group B

Group C

Group D

Group E

Group F

Group G

Group H

Knockout stage

Round of 16
The draw for the round of 16 of the 2009 AFC Cup was held on 12 January 2009, along with the draw for the group stage. The Western Asia matches were played on 26 May, while the Eastern Asia matches were played on 23 June.

|-
!colspan="3"|West Asia

|-
!colspan="3"|East Asia

|}

Quarter-finals
The draw for the quarter-finals and the remaining knockout rounds took place at Kuala Lumpur, Malaysia on 29 June 2009 starting 7:30 pm. The first leg matches were played on 15 September, with the second leg matches played on 30 September.

|}

Semi-finals
The first leg matches were played on 15 October, with the second leg matches played on 21 October.

|}

Final

The 2009 AFC Cup Final was played on 3 November at the home ground of Al Kuwait.

Statistics

Top goalscorers

References

 
2
2009